Molasses Reef is a component of the Florida Reef near Key Largo.

Molasses Reef may also refer to:

Molasses Reef Light, a navigation light on Molasses Reef in Florida
Molasses Reef Wreck, an early 16th-century Spanish shipwreck in the Turks and Caicos Islands